James H. Piles was a teacher, school principal, lawyer, and state legislator in Mississippi.

He was born c. 1842 in Springfield, Ohio, and before attending Oberlin College, worked as a barber. He left Mississippi after Reconstruction ended and worked in Washington D.C. and Memphis, Tennessee.

He represented Panola County in the Mississippi House of Representatives from 1870 to 1875 as a Republican. He served as Assistant Secretary of State in 1875.

See also
African-American officeholders during and following the Reconstruction era

References

People from Springfield, Ohio
Republican Party members of the Mississippi House of Representatives
1840s births
Year of death missing
African-American schoolteachers
African-American state legislators in Mississippi
Ohio lawyers
Schoolteachers from Ohio
African-American politicians during the Reconstruction Era
People from Panola County, Mississippi
19th-century American lawyers
Barbers
Oberlin College alumni